Oaxaca (previously the German Hameln) was a Mexican freighter that was sunk on July 26, 1942 by the German Type IX submarine , commanded by Oberleutnant Günther Pfeffer, a few hours after she left the port of Corpus Christi, Texas. The ship was hit by one torpedo and broke in two, sinking within three or four minutes. Six crewmen were lost.

Sidescan sonar and sub-bottom profiler investigations suggest the ship is sitting upright in two pieces on the seafloor.

References

External links
 
 

Shipwrecks in the Gulf of Mexico
Merchant ships of Mexico
Merchant ships of Germany
Ships sunk by German submarines in World War II
World War II shipwrecks in the Caribbean Sea
Maritime incidents in July 1942
1921 ships
Captured ships